Harlingen is a municipality and a city in the northern Netherlands, in the province of Friesland on the coast of Wadden Sea. Harlingen is a town with a long history of fishing and shipping that received city rights in 1234.

Overview
Harlingen is served by two stations on the railway line from Leeuwarden. From 1904 to 1935 there was a passenger service on the North Friesland Railway, freight being carried until January 1938. Rederij Doeksen operate ferries to the Wadden islands of Vlieland and Terschelling that depart from Harlingen.

The famous Dutch writer Simon Vestdijk was born in Harlingen and used to depict his hometown in his writings as Lahringen.

The town of Harlingen, Texas, in the United States is named after this city because many of the original settlers of the Texas town came from Harlingen.

The Admiralty of Friesland was established in Dokkum in 1597 but moved to Harlingen in 1645.

Population centers 
 Harlingen (West Frisian: Harns)
 Midlum (Mullum)
 Wijnaldum (Winaam)

Notable people 
 Simon Frisius (c.1570–75 – c.1628/29) a Dutch engraver. 
 Maarten Gerritszoon Vries (1589–1647) Dutch cartographer and explorer
 Sebastiaen Jansen Krol (1595–1674) Director of New Netherland 1632/1633 
 Jacob Adriaensz Backer (1609–1651) a Dutch Golden Age painter
 Tako Hajo Jelgersma (1702–1795) a Dutch painter
 Jacobus Deketh (1726–1764) a captain in the Frisian Admiralty
 Joannes de Mol (1726–1782) a Dutch minister, Patriot and porcelain manufacturer
 Court Lambertus van Beyma (1753-1820) a public notary and auctioneer, delegate of the States of Friesland
 Nicolaas Baur (1767–1820) was a Dutch marine artist
 Johannes Kayser (1842-1917) a Dutch architect, primarily of churches
 J.J.L. Duyvendak (1889–1954) a Dutch Sinologist and professor of Chinese 
 Simon Vestdijk (1898–1971) a Dutch writer, nominated 15 times for the Nobel prize in literature
 Peter J Sterkenburg (1955-2000) a Dutch autodidact painter of maritime scenes
 Jan Ykema  (born 1963) a former ice speed skater, 1988 Winter Olympics silver medalist
 Abe de Vries (born 1965) a Frisian poet, essayist, literary critic, journalist, editor, translator and photographer
 Joost Vandebrug (born 1982) a Dutch photographer, video director and documentary film director

Gallery

References

External links

 
 Official website (English)
 streaming webcams (Dutch)

 
Municipalities of Friesland
Populated places in Friesland
Cities in Friesland
Cities in the Netherlands
Port cities and towns in the Netherlands
Port cities and towns of the North Sea
Populated coastal places in the Netherlands